Driven is a racing video game released in 2001 by BAM! Entertainment. The game is based on the movie Driven with Sylvester Stallone.

Reception 

The Game Boy Advance and GameCube versions received "mixed or average reviews", while the PlayStation 2 version received "unfavorable" reviews, according to the review aggregation website Metacritic.

References

External links 

2001 video games
Cancelled Xbox games
GameCube games
PlayStation 2 games
Game Boy Advance games
Racing video games
Video games based on films
Video games developed in the United Kingdom
Video games set in Arizona
Video games set in California
Video games set in Staffordshire
Video games set in Paris
Video games set in Germany
Video games set in New York City
Crawfish Interactive games
Multiplayer and single-player video games